The Heilongdawang Temple (literally Temple of the Great Black Dragon King) is a prominent Chinese folk religion/Shenist temple located in Shanbei, Shaanxi province, in China. The temple enshrines the Black Dragon King with the imperially conferred title of Marquis of the Efficacious Response (灵应侯, Lingyinghou). Dragon kings (龙王, longwang) are water deities popular in droughty Northern China.

The temple was completely destroyed during the anti-religious campaigns of the Cultural Revolution, but rebuilt from scratch in 1982, and since then has enjoyed growing popularity in Shanbei, becoming a case study of the revival of Chinese folk religion in sociological research, as hundreds of thousands of pilgrims and other visitors come for the annual six-day festival. The temple is located in an area known as the Dragon King Valley (Longwanggou).

References

Sources
 Fan Lizhu, Chen Na. The Revival of Indigenous Religion in China. Fudan University, 2013. p. 11
 Adam Yuet Chau. "The Politics of Legitimation and the Revival of Popular Religion in Shaanbei, North-Central China", in Modern China, Vol. 31, No. 2 (April 2005), pp. 236–278. Sage Publications, Inc.

See also
 Chinese folk religion

Folk religious temples in China
Pilgrimage sites